The Sweden–GDR Association was a Sweden-based organization, formed on 23 October 1956 to promote ties between Sweden and the German Democratic Republic (GDR or East Germany). The association published the journal DDR-revyn.

The association was typically seen as pro-communist and ceased to exist in January 1991, following the collapse of GDR.

Bibliography
Abraham, Nils: Die Rolle der Freundschaftsgesellschaft "Schweden-DDR" in der Auslandspropaganda der DDR gegenüber Schweden nach 1972, in Den okände (?) grannen. Tysklandsrelaterad forskning i Sverige, 2005.

References

Organizations established in 1956
Organizations disestablished in 1991
East Germany friendship associations
Political organizations based in Sweden
Germany–Sweden relations
1956 establishments in Sweden
1991 disestablishments in Sweden
Sweden friendship associations